Karayılan may refer to:
 Murat Karayılan, the leader of the PKK.
 Molla Mehmet Karayılan, a Kurdish fighter who fought in the 1910s and 1920s.
 Karayılan, Hatay, a town in Hatay Province, Turkey.